Holmes v. Atlanta, 350 U.S. 879 (1955), was a per curiam order by the Supreme Court of the United States that summarily reversed an order by the Georgia Court of Appeals that permitted the city of Atlanta to allocate a municipal golf course to different races on different days.  The case was remanded to the district court with directions to enter a decree in conformity with Mayor and City Council of Baltimore City v. Dawson.

See also
 List of United States Supreme Court cases, volume 350

References

United States Supreme Court cases
1955 in United States case law
History of Atlanta
United States Supreme Court cases of the Warren Court
Civil rights movement case law
United States racial desegregation case law